The 1989 Coppa Italia Final was the final of the 1988–89 Coppa Italia. The match was played over two legs on 19 and 28 June 1989 between Sampdoria and Napoli. Sampdoria won 4–1 on aggregate. It was Sampdoria's third victory.

First leg

Second leg

References
Coppa Italia 1988/89 statistics at rsssf.com

Coppa Italia Finals
Coppa Italia Final 1989
Coppa Italia Final 1989